Seh Pestanak (also Romanized as Seh Pestānak; also known as Sepestānak, Sībestānak, and Sivistanak) is a village in Khorgam Rural District, Khorgam District, Rudbar County, Gilan Province, Iran. At the 2006 census, its population was 148, in 50 families.

References 

Populated places in Rudbar County